Manokia is a genus of box jellyfish in the Alatinidae family.

Species
The World Register of Marine Species lists the following species:
Manokia stiasnyi (Bigelow, 1938)

References

Alatinidae
Monotypic cnidarian genera
Medusozoa genera